Milton Antonio Scaron Falero (born 22 August 1936 in Montevideo, Uruguay) is a Uruguayan basketball player, born in Montevideo, who competed in the 1956 Summer Olympics and in the 1960 Summer Olympics.

References

External links

1936 births
Living people
Sportspeople from Montevideo
Uruguayan men's basketball players
1959 FIBA World Championship players
Olympic basketball players of Uruguay
Basketball players at the 1956 Summer Olympics
Basketball players at the 1960 Summer Olympics
Basketball players at the 1963 Pan American Games
Olympic bronze medalists for Uruguay
Olympic medalists in basketball
Medalists at the 1956 Summer Olympics
Pan American Games competitors for Uruguay